Pichagh-Gheimeh or Pıçaq-Qeyme(Azerbaijani/Persian: پیچاق‌قیمه) is one of Ardabil's (a city in Iranian Azerbaijan) traditional foods. The word "pıçaq" in Azerbaijani language means knife and may refer to the almond used in making this food, which has a knife-shaped appearance. 

Pichah-Gheimeh is usually made with lamb's meat, sliced onions, almond, and egg. One of the most important secrets of making this dish is to fry the sliced onions in oil, which turns the color of onions from white to brown. Fried eggs are used in order to design it beautifully. White rice is also eaten with it. This food is also cooked by cities and villages near Ardabil, such as Tabriz and Sareyn.

The generous use of oil makes the food greasy, but most people visiting Ardabil enjoy eating this traditional food. Other traditional dishes include a soup named "Ashe-dough" and a special Halva named "Halva-siah".

References

moeen encyclopedia, قیمه

Iranian cuisine